Hong Kong Pro Cycling was a UCI Continental cycling team based in Hong Kong that existed from 2005 to 2007.

References

UCI Continental Teams (Asia)
Cycling teams established in 2005
Cycling teams disestablished in 2007
Cycling teams based in Hong Kong
2005 establishments in Hong Kong
2007 disestablishments in Hong Kong